Edith Ann "E.D." Hill (née Tarbox; born July 27, 1961), known professionally as E.D. Donahey during her second marriage, is an American journalist.  She has been a news anchor and radio host and formerly worked for the Fox News Channel.

Early life and education
Hill earned her bachelor's degree in journalism from the University of Texas at Austin, located in Austin, Texas, where she was a member of Delta Gamma Sorority.

Career
She was a VJ for VH1 from September 1986 to August 1987. She landed roles as a reporter and spent time at WPXI-TV, WHDH-TV, and WABC-TV where she was brought in to co-anchor the station's morning newscast as well as its just launched midday broadcast. During this time Hill was still using her maiden name, Edye Tarbox.

In 1998, Hill joined the Fox News, where she served as an anchor for Fox & Friends from 1998 to 2006. She later moved to the 2:00 p.m. hour after serving as host of the 11:00 a.m. to 12:00 p.m. block of Fox News Live from 2006 until her show America's Pulse was canceled in 2008. She also co-hosted Bill O'Reilly's The Radio Factor for five years. She had also substituted for Bill O'Reilly on The O'Reilly Factor.

In 2007, the television-industry blog TV Newser reported that it had been given a copy of an internal Fox News Channel memorandum that gave the following description of America's Pulse: "During this hour, E. D. will present the news in a fair & balanced way with her own passionate style and sense of humor."

"Terrorist fist jab" incident
On the June 6, 2008, episode of America's Pulse, Hill asked whether a fist bump between then-presidential candidate Barack Obama, and his wife Michelle, after the final 2008 Presidential Democratic primaries was a "terrorist fist jab". Hill, introducing an upcoming discussion before a commercial break, posited that the gesture was either "A fist bump? A pound? [or] A terrorist fist jab?," but never explained the term when the segment continued after the break. The incident set off a controversy among bloggers and television commentators. Hill apologized for her comments the next day. The next week, the Fox News Channel announced that Hill's show America's Pulse had been canceled. Martha McCallum's show The Live Desk would become two hours (1–3 p.m.), and Trace Gallagher would become a co-host with McCallum.

In November 2008, after the general election, it was announced that Hill's contract with Fox would not be renewed. She would continue with the network until her contract expired. Senior Vice President of Programming at Fox Bill Shine says that he "chose not to renew E.D.'s latest contract" but noted that "Hill has been a valued contributor to the success of FNC over the years, and we wish her all the best".

On October 14, 2008, Hill was a guest co-host of the ABC daytime show The View, then returned to co-host again on September 23, 2009 and September 25, 2009, while Elisabeth Hasselbeck was on maternity leave; she also hosted on July 28, 2010, while Barbara Walters was on leave.

In February 2011, it was announced that she would be joining the staff of In the Arena with Eliot Spitzer on CNN, but just five months later CNN elected to cancel the show instead.

Glenn Beck announced on his GBTV Show August 20, 2012 that E.D. Hill would be part of GBTV's on-site coverage of the 2012  Republican National Convention in Tampa, FL.

On October 6, 2012, Hill moderated The Rumble in the Air-Conditioned Auditorium, a debate between Bill O'Reilly and Jon Stewart.

Awards
Hill won a local Emmy Award for Outstanding News Special while working for WHDH-TV in Boston (1990–91), and has also received a Golden Quill Award for live spot news reporting.

Books
In November 2005, William Morrow published Hill's first book, a collection of personal profiles entitled Going Places: How America's Best and Brightest Got Started Down the Road of Life. Her next book, I'm Not Your Friend, I'm Your Parent, was published in the United States 2007 and published in China in 2010.

Employment history

Personal life
On April 29, 1989, while a news anchor at WPXI-TV in Pittsburgh, she married Marc Philip Weill (the son of financier Sanford Weill), at the time a vice president of Smith Barney, Harris Upham & Company in New York City, New York. They had two children and divorced in 1995.

Her second marriage was to J. David Donahey, with whom she has one son.

In February 2002, she announced her engagement to her boyfriend of two years venture capitalist Joe Hill. They married June 1, 2002. He has three children from a previous marriage, and together they have a daughter and a son.

In February 2010, she underwent a preventive double mastectomy.

See also

List of CNN anchors
List of University of Texas at Austin alumni

References

External links

20th-century American women writers
20th-century American non-fiction writers
21st-century American women writers
American radio DJs
Television anchors from Boston
CNN people
Fox News people
Journalists from Texas
New York (state) television reporters
Television anchors from New York City
People from Dripping Springs, Texas
People from Waco, Texas
Television personalities from Pittsburgh
Living people
Moody College of Communication alumni
Writers from Minnesota
Writers from Pittsburgh
VJs (media personalities)
Journalists from Pennsylvania
American women non-fiction writers
21st-century American non-fiction writers
American women television journalists
American women radio presenters
1961 births